Ross Township may refer to:

Illinois
 Ross Township, Edgar County, Illinois
 Ross Township, Pike County, Illinois
 Ross Township, Vermilion County, Illinois

Indiana
 Ross Township, Clinton County, Indiana
 Ross Township, Lake County, Indiana

Iowa
 Ross Township, Franklin County, Iowa
 Ross Township, Taylor County, Iowa

Kansas
 Ross Township, Cherokee County, Kansas
 Ross Township, Osborne County, Kansas, in Osborne County, Kansas

Michigan
 Ross Township, Michigan

Minnesota
 Ross Township, Roseau County, Minnesota

North Dakota
 Ross Township, Mountrail County, North Dakota, in Mountrail County, North Dakota

Ohio
 Ross Township, Butler County, Ohio
 Ross Township, Greene County, Ohio
 Ross Township, Jefferson County, Ohio
 Ross Township, Wood County, Ohio

Pennsylvania
 Ross Township, Allegheny County, Pennsylvania
 Ross Township, Luzerne County, Pennsylvania
 Ross Township, Monroe County, Pennsylvania

Township name disambiguation pages